Bataan Rescue is a 2003 television documentary film about the Raid at Cabanatuan. Produced by PBS for the American Experience documentary program, it begins with the Fall of Bataan in 1942 up to the titular event in January 1945, where more than 500 prisoners of war were liberated from a Japanese camp in Cabanatuan, Nueva Ecija. Directed by Peter Jones and written and produced by David Axelrod, the film first aired on PBS in the United States on July 7, 2003.

Interviewees
Malcolm Amos, U.S. Army
Robert Anderson, 6th Ranger Battalion
Bert Bank
Richard Beck, POW
Robert Body, U.S. Army
John Cook, POW
Patrick Ganio, Filipino veteran
James Hildebrand, U.S. Army
Forest Johnson, author
Jose Juachon, Filipino veteran
Robert Prince, 6th Ranger Battalion
Leland Provencher, 6th Ranger Battalion
John Richardson, 6th Ranger Battalion
Francis Schilli, 6th Ranger Battalion
Hampton Sides, author of Ghost Soldiers
Edward "Tommie" Thomas, POW

Critical response
The Oregonian gave Bataan Rescue a positive review, commending it as a "fairly balanced account, with Glenn reading the big picture and the veterans filling in the small, vivid and often ghastly details."

Home media
Bataan Rescue was first released on VHS by PBS on July 29, 2003. PBS would later release the film on DVD by February 15, 2005.

See also
The Great Raid, a 2005 film about the rescue

References

External links
Official PBS site

2003 television films
2003 films
2003 documentary films
American Experience
American documentary television films
Documentary films about World War II
Films about United States Army Rangers
Military history of the Philippines during World War II
Pacific War films
2000s English-language films
2000s American films